The King's pain recorder is a device for patients to record their level of pain by illuminating a strip of light emitting diodes proportional to the pain they are feeling. It is one way of eliminating observer bias. E. A. Welchew developed a similar system in 1982.

References 

Pain scales